The Fort Kent - Clair Border Crossing is at the Clair–Fort Kent Bridge that connects the town of Fort Kent, Maine, with Clair, New Brunswick, on the Canada–United States border. It marks the northern terminus of U.S. Route 1. This crossing first opened in 1905 with the construction of a footbridge that traversed the Saint John River. A replacement for the steel bridge that was built in 1930 opened July 31, 2014.

The crossing is open 24 hours a day. About 2,000 cars use it a day.

See also
 List of Canada–United States border crossings

References

Canada–United States border crossings
Fort Kent, Maine
Madawaska County, New Brunswick
1905 establishments in Maine
1905 establishments in New Brunswick
U.S. Route 1